Alistair Edward Brownlee MBE (born 23 April 1988) is a British triathlete. He is the only male athlete to hold two Olympic titles in the individual triathlon event, winning gold medals in the 2012 and 2016 Olympic Games. He is also a four-time World Champion in triatlon being Triathlon World Champion twice (2009, 2011) and World Team Champion (2011, 2014) twice, a four-time European Champion (2010, 2011, 2014, 2019), and the 2014 Commonwealth champion. Brownlee is the only athlete, male or female, to have completed a grand slam of Olympic, World, continental and Commonwealth championships. Brownlee is also a one-time world champion in aquathlon.

His brother Jonathan Brownlee is also a decorated triathlete. Along with long time Spanish rivals Mario Mola and Javier Gómez, and Frenchman Vincent Luis, the Brownlee brothers were considered the dominant male Olympic distance triathletes of the 2010s, and the Brownlees were particularly dominant in the Olympic triathlon races themselves, having won three gold, one silver and one bronze medal between them.

Brownlee was appointed Member of the Order of the British Empire (MBE) in the 2013 New Year Honours for services to sport.

Early life and education 
Brownlee was educated at Bradford Grammar School, a co-educational independent school in the city of Bradford in Yorkshire. He then started a medicine degree at Girton College, Cambridge, but left after just the first term having decided instead to study Sports Science and Physiology at the University of Leeds, where he gained his degree in 2010. He also completed an MSc in Finance in 2013 at Leeds Metropolitan University.

His father Keith was a runner, while his mother Cathy was a swimmer. The eldest of three boys, he has two younger brothers, Jonathan and Edward (b.1995). His younger brother Jonathan Brownlee is also a triathlete, winning the bronze medal at the 2012 Summer Olympics, the silver medal at the 2016 Summer Olympics, and a gold medal in the mixed relay triathlon at the 2020 Summer Olympics and his youngest brother Edward is also a keen sportsman but prefers rugby and water polo over the triathlon.

Brownlee was introduced to triathlon at a young age by his uncle, Simon Hearnshaw, who regularly competed in the sport. As a junior, he was a successful fell and cross country runner, coming second in the Junior English Cross Country Championships and winning the Yorkshire County title on several occasions.

He has said that "It was only when I won the World Junior Championships in 2006 that I made the conscious decision to really focus on triathlon". This was when Brownlee left Cambridge to move back to Yorkshire, focus on triathlon and study at the University of Leeds. He described his decision to leave Cambridge to a student newspaper there in 2013, saying "trying to fit 30+ hours of training around my degree was pretty impossible. I decided that triathlon was my true passion, so I moved back to study at Leeds on a less demanding course, and in a city where the sport was well supported at the time by British Triathlon". He was a member of the triathlon club based at Leeds Metropolitan University's Carnegie High Performance centre, and was coached by Carnegie Director of Sport Malcolm Brown, and in swimming by Jack Maitland.

Triathlon career
 
Brownlee represented Great Britain at the 2008 Summer Olympics in the triathlon event, finishing in 12th place and first British competitor. During the 2008 season, his best world cup finish was 3rd place in Madrid and he also won the under-23 world championship.

He won the 2009 ITU Triathlon World Championship, winning all five of the season's ITU World Championship Series events in which he competed. He was victorious in Madrid, Washington D.C, Kitzbühel and London before winning the 2009 season Grand Final, held on Australia's Gold Coast on 12 September and thereby became the first person ever to win the ITU world Triathlon titles for Junior Men (2006), Under 23 Men (2008) and Senior Men (2009).

During the 2010 off season, Brownlee sustained a stress fracture of the femur and was not able to return to competition until June, which made defence of his ITU title almost impossible. He did however mark his return to competitive triathlon with a convincing win in Madrid, followed a month later with the European Triathlon Union (ETU) Championships title. Collapsing with exhaustion at the London race in late July, meant that despite winning the final race of the 2010 ITU Series in Budapest, he lost his overall World Championship title to Javier Gómez.

In the April opening event of the 2011 ITU Championship season in Sydney, Brownlee suffered a heavy fall while in the lead which brought early disappointment and a 29th-place finish. This was contrasted with outstanding success when, in the space of just twenty-one days during June 2011, he convincingly won the next two ITU series events (in Madrid and Kitzbühel) and, following a puncture whilst in the lead and having to make up more than 30 seconds on the new leaders, successfully defended his European title at the 2011 Pontevedra ETU Triathlon European Championships and shared the podium with his brother Jonathan, who took the silver medal. Alistair won the 2011 ITU world title, after winning the Grand Final in Beijing and the gold medal at the London 2012 Olympics, while his brother took the bronze medal.

Brownlee won the Commonwealth Games Triathlon in 2014, controlling the race with his brother from the start, before pulling away on the first lap of the run in dominating style; Jonathan took the silver medal. Brownlee also took gold in the mixed triathlon team relay at the 2014 Commonwealth Games, with brother Jonathan, Vicky Holland and Jodie Stimpson.

At the final race of the 2016 World Triathlon Series in Cozumel, Mexico, his brother Jonathan, who had been leading comfortably as they headed into the final kilometre of the 10 km run, began to show the effects of heat and exhaustion, weaving across the course and appearing to be on the verge of collapse. Alistair abandoned his own chance of winning the race, instead opting to assist his brother over the line, finally pushing him to a second-place finish and coming in third himself. The South African Henri Schoeman, who had won bronze behind the Brownlees in Rio, overtook the Brownlee brothers to win the race.

Brownlee made his long-course debut at the half-iron distance Challenge Mogan-Gran Canaria triathlon in April 2017, which he won in a time of 4:03:09, finishing over eight minutes ahead of the runner-up. He took another win the following month when he triumphed in the North American Ironman 70.3 Championships in St. George, Utah, which secured his place in the Ironman 70.3 World Championship in September 2017.

Titles
 Seven time Yorkshire Cross Country Champion (U13–Senior)
 Seven time Yorkshire fellrunning champion
 2006 Junior European Duathlon Champion
 2006 Junior World Champion
 2007 Junior European Champion
 2007 Junior World Vice-Champion
 2008 U23 World Champion
 2009 Hyde Park Triathlon Champion
 2009 British National Elite Duathlon Champion
 2009 ITU World Champion
 2010 ETU European Champion
 2011 World Team Champion 
 2011 ETU European Champion
 2011 ITU World Champion
 2012 World Team Champion 
 2012 Olympic Champion
 2014 European Champion
 2014 World Team Champion 
 2014 Commonwealth Games Champion
 2014 Commonwealth Games Team Gold
 2016 Olympic Champion
 2016 Aquathlon Champion

ITU competitions
In the six years from 2005 to 2010, Alistair Brownlee took part in 31 ITU competitions and achieved 24 top ten positions, among which were 13 gold medals, 5 silver medals, and 2 bronze medals.

2008, won the U23 World Championship and placed 12th at the Olympic Games in Beijing.
2009, won the Dextro Energy World Championship Series placing first in almost all of the circuit's triathlons (i.e. Madrid, Washington DC, Kitzbühel, London, and Gold Coast).
2010, opened the season with the European Championship gold medal but subsequently had to put up with a stress fracture of the femur.
2011, won the World Championship Series triathlons in Madrid and Kitzbühel, leading the ITU World Championship ranking, and crowned himself again European Elite Champion.

The following list is based upon the official ITU rankings and the ITU Athlete's Profile Page.
Unless indicated otherwise, the following events are triathlons (Olympic Distance) and refer to the Elite category.

Key: BG = British Gas (the sponsor); DNF = Did not finish; DNS = Did not start; U23 = Under 23

French Club Championship Series 
In 2010, only the femur fracture could slow Brownlee's dominance for some time. At the opening triathlon in Dunkirk (23 May 2010), Alistair was not present, his brother Jonathan won the gold medal. At Beauvais (13 June 2010) Alistair placed 9th. At the Triathlon de Paris (18 July 2010), however, and at Tourangeaux (29 August 2010), Brownlee won the gold medals again. At the Grand Final in La Baule (Triathlon Audencia, 18 September 2010), Alistair placed 2nd, Jonathan 3rd, and their rival Javier Gómez Noya won gold.

In 2011, Brownlee took part in the French Club Championship Series Lyonnaise des Eaux representing the club ECS Triathlon, which, thanks to the Brownlee brothers and Javier Gómez Noya, had already won the Club Championship in 2010. At Nice (24 April 2011), Dunkirk (22 May 2011), and Paris (9 July 2011) Brownlee was the winner.

See also
 2012 Summer Olympics and Paralympics gold post boxes

References

External links

 
 
 
 
  
 Alistair Brownlee at BritishTriathlonMedia.org
 Alistair Brownlee at Triathlon.org
 Alistair Brownlee at Channel 4
 Alistair Brownlee at BBC World Olympic Dreams

1988 births
Living people
Sportspeople from Leeds
English male triathletes
Alumni of Girton College, Cambridge
Members of the Order of the British Empire
Triathletes at the 2008 Summer Olympics
Olympic triathletes of Great Britain
People educated at Bradford Grammar School
Alumni of the University of Leeds
Alumni of Leeds Beckett University
Duathletes
British fell runners
Triathletes at the 2012 Summer Olympics
Triathletes at the 2016 Summer Olympics
Olympic gold medallists for Great Britain
English Olympic medallists
Olympic medalists in triathlon
Medalists at the 2012 Summer Olympics
Medalists at the 2016 Summer Olympics
Triathletes at the 2014 Commonwealth Games
Commonwealth Games gold medallists for England
Commonwealth Games medallists in triathlon
Triathletes at the 2018 Commonwealth Games
People from Bramhope
British male triathletes
Medallists at the 2014 Commonwealth Games
Medallists at the 2018 Commonwealth Games